Veliky Novgorod is a city in Russia.

Novgorod (Russian for new town or new city) may also refer to:

Places
Novgorod Oblast, a federal subject of Russia
Novgorod Airport, an airport in the city of Veliky Novgorod
Nizhny Novgorod, a city in Russia, located in Nizhny Novgorod Oblast
Novhorod-Siverskyi, a city in Ukraine
Novgorod Republic, a medieval Russian state between the 12th and 15th centuries

Other uses
Novgorod (newspaper), a Russian newspaper
Russian monitor Novgorod, a circular vessel laid down in 1871
Novgorod case, the conventional term used in the Russian blogosphere and mass media for the controversial criminal case 
Novgorod Codex, the oldest book of Kievan Rus'
3799 Novgorod, a minor planet
Old Novgorod dialect

See also
Novgorodsky (disambiguation)

Vilanova (disambiguation), the same kind of name in Catalan
Newtown (disambiguation), the same kind of name in English
Neustadt (disambiguation), the same kind of name in German
Novigrad (disambiguation), the same kind of name in Serbo-Croatian
Nowogród (disambiguation), the same kind of name in Polish